Henri Morel (July 21, 1867 – 1934|) was an Ontario butcher and political figure. He represented Nipissing in the Legislative Assembly of Ontario from 1908 to 1919 and from 1923 to 1930 as a Conservative member. His name also appears as Henry Morel.

He was born in Rimouski, Quebec, the son of Xavier Morel, and educated in Arnprior, Ontario. In 1890, he married Alexina Bangs. He lived in Mattawa. Morel ran unsuccessfully for the Nipissing seat in the House of Commons in 1930. He died in 1934.

References 

1867 births
1934 deaths
Progressive Conservative Party of Ontario MPPs
Franco-Ontarian people
People from Rimouski
People from Mattawa, Ontario